Birkilane (or Birkelane) is a town and commune in Senegal. It is the principal municipality and administrative centre of Birkilane Department in Kaffrine Region, about 30 km from the town of Kaolack.

History
Birkelane was founded around 1850 by a Serer named Boure Koulemane Dione, who lived in the northeast of Senegal.

In 2008 it was designated a commune of the newly created département of Birkilane.

Geography
The town is located on the N1 national road  from Kaolack to Tambacounda and is home to some 7000 inhabitants. The nearest other towns are Nguer, Ganki, Band and Diamal.

References

External links

Populated places in Kaffrine Region
Communes of Senegal
French West Africa